Gillian Plowman is an English playwright. She is the author of more than 20 plays. She won the 1988 Verity Bargate Award for her play Me and My Friend. Originally staged at the Soho Poly, it was later revived at the Chichester Festival and at the Orange Tree Theatre. In 2008, the Oval House Theatre staged her play Yours Abundantly, From Zimbabwe.

Plowman is a patron of the Royal Air Force Theatrical Association, along with Sir Peter Hall, Sir Frederick Sowrey, Stephen Daldry and Ben Humphrey.

References

English dramatists and playwrights
Living people
Year of birth missing (living people)